Neola is a village located in Jhajjar district in the Indian state of Haryana.

Demographics
In 2011, Neola village has population of 1843 of which 949 are males while 894 are females.

Religion
Majority of the residents are Hindu.

See also 
 Sarola
 Girdharpur, Jhajjar
 Khudan
 Chhapar, Jhajjar
 Dhakla, Jhajjar

References 

Villages in Jhajjar district